Margarosticha argyrograpta is a moth in the family Crambidae. It was described by George Hampson in 1917. It is found on the Bismarck Archipelago.

The wingspan is 18–22 mm. The forewings are orange-yellow with a silvery-white subbasal patch, a silvery-white medial band, a triangular silvery-white postmedial patch, as well as a wedge-shaped silvery-white subterminal band. The hindwings are orange-yellow, with a white base and a silvery-white medial band, as well as a metallic silvery postmedial lunule.

References

Acentropinae
Moths described in 1917